The Caribbean martin or white-bellied martin (Progne dominicensis) is a large  swallow.

It has at various times been considered alternatively as a race of the purple martin, Progne subis.

Distribution
It breeds throughout the Caribbean, except on Cuba and Isla de la Juventud, where it is replaced by the related Cuban martin (P. cryptoleuca).  It is closely related to the aforementioned species, as well as the Sinaloa martin (P. sinaloae)  to which it used to be considered conspecific. There are sight records from mainland Central and South America, and most birds appear to  migrate to the South American mainland. A single bird was recorded in Key West, Florida, on May 9, 1895 (AOU 2000).

Description

Adult Caribbean martins are 18.5 cm in length, with a forked tail and relatively broad wings, and weigh 40 g. Adult males are a glossy blue-black with contrasting white lower underparts. Females and juveniles are duller than the male, with grey-brown breast and flanks and white lower underparts.

Behaviour
The Caribbean martin nests in cavities in banks and buildings, or old woodpecker holes. 3-6 eggs are laid in the lined nest, and incubated for 15 days, with another 26-27 to fledging. Just as the purple martin, this species may compete with other passerines for nesting cavities. In particular, the main foe is the house sparrow  in urban areas, where they mostly use man-made structures, whereas in more rural locations Picidae holes in coconut trees are favored, and there is less competition with the sparrows.

Caribbean martins are gregarious birds which hunt for insects in flight. Their call is a gurgly chew-chew.

References

 American Ornithologists' Union (AOU) (2000): Forty-second supplement to the American Ornithologists' Union Check-list of North American Birds. Auk 117(3): 847–858. DOI: 10.1642/0004-8038(2000)117[0847:FSSTTA]2.0.CO;2
 ffrench, Richard; O'Neill, John Patton & Eckelberry, Don R. (1991): A guide to the birds of Trinidad and Tobago (2nd edition). Comstock Publishing, Ithaca, N.Y.. 
Hilty, Steven L. (2003): Birds of Venezuela. Christopher Helm, London. 
Turner, Angela & Rose, Chris (1989): Swallows and martins: an identification guide and handbook. Houghton Mifflin. 

Caribbean martin
Endemic birds of the Caribbean
Birds of the Caribbean
Birds of Jamaica
Birds of Hispaniola
Birds of the Dominican Republic
Birds of Haiti
Birds of Puerto Rico
Birds of the Lesser Antilles
Caribbean martin
Caribbean martin